U Craiova 1948, commonly known as FC U Craiova 1948 or FC U Craiova, is a Romanian professional football club based in Craiova, Dolj County, which competes in the Liga I. 

It is along with CS Universitatea Craiova one of the two entities asserting the history of the original Universitatea Craiova football team, which between 1948 and 1991 won four national titles and five national cups. During the latter year, when the sports club dissolved its football department, FC Universitatea Craiova took its place in the top flight. Generally considered the same entity with the old club, it continued its tradition for the next two decades, but was reorganised several times and retroactively deemed an unofficial successor. In 2012, FC U retired from every competition following their temporary banishment since 2011. 

After starting over from the lower leagues in 2017, FC U returned to the Liga I in the 2021–22 season. To the same degree with CS U, FC U claims all the trophies  and records of the original Universitatea Craiova, but according to court orders its only major honour would be the 1992–93 Cupa României.{{refn|group=note|As of November 2017, LPF attributes all Universitatea Craiova trophies won between 1948 and 1991 to the CS Universitatea Craiova entity. FC U's only major trophy would be the 1992–93 Cupa României, although it is also claimed by CS U. Another court order from 2018 suggested that neither of the current clubs actually hold the original honours.<ref name="court_2018">{{cite web|url=https://www.gsp.ro/fotbal/liga-3/s-a-intors-circul-in-banie-sefii-lui-cs-u-craiova-rad-de-rivala-fc-u-si-de-peluza-sud-inaintea-duelului-de-vineri-din-liga-a-3-a-a-venit-si-replica-lui-mititelu-552068.html|title=S-a întors circul în Bănie! Șefii lui CS U Craiova râd de rivala FC U și de Peluza Sud înaintea duelului de vineri din Liga a 3-a " A venit și replica lui Mititelu|trans-title=The show returns to Bănie! CS U Craiova's officials make fun of rival FC U and Peluza Sud' before the Liga 3 match on Friday " Mititelu also replied|newspaper=Gazeta Sporturilor|language=ro|date=1 November 2018|access-date=1 November 2018}}</ref>}} The two sides currently share the Complex Sportiv Craiova stadium.

History

FC Universitatea Craiova in the 1990s and 2000s
In 1991, Universitatea Craiova conquered its last national title and Romanian Cup, under the management of Sorin Cârțu.  However, in the same year, the CS Universitatea Craiova sports club dissolved its football section and Fotbal Club Universitatea Craiova continued its tradition until the early 2010s (until 1994, the club was still controlled by the Ministry of National Education). 
After disappointing results in the 1991–92 European Cup and 1992–93 UEFA Cup campaigns FC Universitatea Craiova saw domestic glory by winning the 1992–93 Cupa României and finishing on the podium the same year. After that they will go on the 1993–94 European Cup Winners' Cup campaign where they will be eliminated by french side Paris Saint-Germain.
The next seasons Craiova will finish second in the league in 1993–94 and 1994–95 respectively and will lose two cup finals in 1993–94 and 1997–98, also participating in 1994–95 UEFA Cup  and 1995–96 Intertoto Cup.

FC Universitatea Craiova started the 2000s playing a Cup final in 2000 and with participations in the 2000–01 UEFA Cup and 2001 Intertoto Cup. 
The next 5 seasons saw Craiova finishing between 4th and 8th places but relegating in 2005. The team will go back up after one season in Divizia B. The next three seasons saw Craiova between the 9th and 7th places. During these years in the 2008–09 Liga 1 with  Nicolò Napoli as manager and players like Costea brothers (Florin Costea and Mihai Costea), Andrei Prepeliță or Julius Wobay, Craiova had a decent run winning against rivals Dinamo and defending champions CFR Cluj and almost qualifying for the 2009–10 UEFA Europa League.
The next year Craiova relegated again and legal problems started to appear.

Decline and legal problems (2011–2013)
On 20 July 2011, the club was temporarily excluded by the Romanian Football Federation for failing to withdraw their dispute with former coach Victor Piţurcă from a civil court, as per article 57 of the FRF statute which states that the Football Federation solves all the sports lawsuits. However, the article allows disputes regarding employment contracts to be adjudicated in civil court. The exclusion decision was approved by the FRF General Assembly on 14 May 2012. All of the squad players were declared free agents and signed with other clubs.

A criminal investigation was started by the National Anticorruption Directorate on 22 October 2011, against the heads of the Romanian Professional Football League and of the Football Federation, as well as against the Executive Committee members of the FRF, on charges of official misconduct in the case of the exclusion. On 14 May 2012, the Executive Committee validated the temporary exclusion decision taken on 20 July 2011.

In April 2014 the High Court of Cassation and Justice confirmed that the Romanian Football Federation "acted in accordance with regulations and statutes in force when members voted to exclude the club". The criminal case against the president of the FRF was also dismissed in 2017.
On 22 June 2012, the Bucharest Court of Appeal ruled that the exclusion of FC U Craiova from FRF was illegal. On 15 November 2012, the Court ruled that the validation decision was also illegal. Although the club was invited to sign up in the Liga II for the 2012–13 season, the owner of the club refused this invitation.

On 2 March 2013, the club announced that it filed a request to rejoin the competitions, starting from the 2013–14 season, in Liga II. However, at the same time, the local authorities from the city of Craiova created another football team, called CS Universitatea Craiova, claiming the right to continue the team that was removed from Liga I in 2011. A new legal battle soon started between the two. Eventually CS Universitatea was acknowledged as owner of the "Universitatea Craiova" brand and was allowed to list the record of Universitatea Craiova between 1948 and 1991, but not with the record for the next 20 years, that FC Universitatea is now allowed to claim.

In the meantime, in the summer of 2013, both FC Universitatea and CS Universitatea officially rejoined the Liga II competition, Series II. The first match of this team was the victory against SCM Argeşul Piteşti in the fourth round of the Romanian Cup, qualifying to the fifth round of the competition. FC Universitatea and CS Universitatea competed in the same league and met in two games that year, both ended 0–0. With a more stable and sustainable financing, CS Universitatea promoted to Liga I that year, while FC Universitatea withdrew from the competition. The company operating the team went bankrupt, so FC Universitatea no longer appeared in any competition.

 Rebirth as U Craiova 1948 (2017–present) 
In 2017, Adrian Mititelu created a new company and his team was allowed to participate in the top regional tier of Dolj County. The team consisted of a lot of young prospects and experienced players that played for the team in the past like Ovidiu Dănănae and Mihai Dina and Nicolò Napoli in his fifth spell as a manager. The team managed to win the county championship without a single defeat and the Dolj County phase of the Romanian Cup achieving the double at the county level. By winning the championship FC U Craiova qualified for the Liga IV 2017–2018 promotion play-offs to Liga III which they won by forfeit because the team they were drawn against could not play the match.

In the 2018-2019 season, U Craiova 1948 now in Liga III, former player Mădălin Ciucă returned as team captain until his retiring after the season. 
Unfortunately the team failed to gain promotion to Liga II after finishing on second place. FC U Craiova tried again to promote to Liga II during the 2019–20 season of Liga III after they were drawn in a series IV consisting of teams from south-west region of Romania and Eugen Trică being appointed as manager. The team were leading the table by 13 point from the second place with 13 wins, 3 draws and 0 defeats but the season was interrupted on 9 March 2020, after 16 rounds, due to COVID-19 pandemic. On 11 May 2020, the Romanian Football Federation announced that the season was discontinued and the best-ranked teams from each series (after 16 rounds) were promoted to Liga II.

For the 2020–21 U Craiova 1948 brought a lot of reinforcement like Jérémy Huyghebaert, Andrea Compagno and the representative of the youth nationals teams Dragoș Albu who would later become team's captain in order to get the promotion in the first year. The season saw U Craiova on top of the league most of the time but during it, there were five managerial changes. Eugen Trică will get sacked in the pre-season in favor of former manager  Nicolò Napoli who was in his sixth spell at the club. He left with a high profile win against Bucharest rivals Rapid București, only to be replaced by Dan Vasilică who was the caretaker for the team until Ovidiu Stîngă was appointed. Eventually after poor results from Stîngă, Trică returned once again.
Ultimately U Craiova reached the play-offs of the competition and got the promotion to Liga 1 after a draw against FK Miercurea Ciuc, and later secured the title after a win over Rapid. This promotion meant that after a lot of ups and downs over the last 10 years, U Craiova 1948 got in to  the first tier of romanian football for the first time since 2011.

For the first year in Liga I, after a 10 years absence U Craiova changed a lot in the squad whith a lot of players no longer needed many foreigners were brought to the club most notably Juan Bauza, Samuel Asamoah and Dominik Kovačić. At the club was also brought as a coach former national for Romania with a joint record of 35 goals (alongside Gheorghe Hagi) Adrian Mutu. Like the previous season, U Craiova went through managerial changes, Adrian Mutu will get sacked and will be followed by Eugen Trică and Flavius Stoican with Dan Vasilică acting as a caretaker in between those changes, only for Nicolò Napoli to return to Craiova for the 7th time. Napoli revitalized the entire squad but being to far away from the play-offs at the time of his spell Craiova went to the play-out round of the competition and managed to achieve the goal of avoiding relegation finishing on the 10th place.

Support
FC U Craiova 1948 is supported by the Peluza Sud 97'' ultras. Due to the strong division among the Universitatea fans in the city, the other ultras groups either support CS Universitatea Craiova or remain neutral.

In March 2018, FC U Craiova supporters attending a friendly game between Romania and Sweden at the Stadionul Ion Oblemenco booed CSU Craiova player Alexandru Mitriță upon being substituted out.

FC U's main rival is FC Dinamo București. The rivalry was amplified in 2002 and 2005 when Dinamo transferred an important group of players from Craiova. Other rivalries of FC U are with Steaua București and CS Universitatea Craiova, the latter rivalry because FC U claims the history of Universitatea.

Honours
Note: As of November 2017, LPF attributes all Universitatea Craiova trophies won between 1948 and 1991 to CS Universitatea Craiova. Another court order from 2018 suggested that neither of the current clubs actually hold the original honours.

Domestic

Leagues
Liga I
Runners-up (2): 1993–94, 1994–95
Liga II
Winners (2): 2005–06, 2020–21
Liga III
Winners (1): 2019–20
Runners-up (1): 2018–19
Liga IV – Dolj County
Winners (1): 2017–18

Cups
Cupa României
Winners (1): 1992–93
Runners-up (3): 1993–94, 1997–98, 1999–2000
Cupa României – Dolj County
Winners (1): 2017–18

Friendly
Norcia Winter Cup Italy
Winners  (1): 2003

Players

First-team squad

Other players under contract

Out on loan

Player of the Year
Each season since 2021 the fans have voted through a poll on the U Craiova official Facebook page the player on the team they feel is the most worthy of recognition for his performances during that season.

Club officials

Board of directors & employers 

 Last updated: 10 March 2022
 Source: Board of Directors

Current technical staff 

 Last updated: 10 March 2023
 Source: Board of Directors

European record

League history

Notable former players
The footballers enlisted below have had a significant number of caps and goals accumulated throughout a certain number of seasons for the club and the players whose name is listed in bold represented their countries at junior and/or senior level while they played for the club.

Romania

  Claudiu Bălan
  Ștefan Bărboianu
  Mircea Bornescu
  Cristian Chivu
  Mădălin Ciucă
  Florin Costea
  Mihai Costea
  Gheorghe Craioveanu
  Cătălin Crăciunescu
  Silvian Cristescu
  Ovidiu Dănănae
  Mihai Dina
  Dragoș Firțulescu
  Cornel Frăsineanu
  Ionel Gane
  Valerică Găman
  Constantin Gângioveanu
  Silviu Lung Jr.
  Ionuț Luțu
  Corneliu Papură
  Gabriel Popescu
  Andrei Prepeliță
  Marius Sava
  Robert Săceanu
  Ovidiu Stoianof
  Dorel Stoica
  Eugen Trică
  Adrian Ungur

Australia
  Michael Baird
  Spase Dilevski
  Josh Mitchell
  Joshua Rose
Italy
  Andrea Compagno
Sierra Leone
  Julius Wobay

Notable former coaches

  Ilie Balaci
  Marian Bondrea
  Sorin Cârţu
  Emerich Jenei
  Ion Oblemenco
  Constantin Oţet
  Aurel Țicleanu
  Victor Piţurcă
  Mircea Rădulescu
  Emil Sandoi
  Silviu Stănescu
  Eugen Trică
  José Ramón Alexanko

References

External links
 Official website 

 
Sport in Craiova
Association football clubs established in 1991
Football clubs in Dolj County
University and college association football clubs in Romania
Liga I clubs
Liga II clubs
Liga III clubs
Liga IV clubs
1991 establishments in Romania
FC Universitatea Craiova